Haltwhistle Castle Hill is a ruined Norman earth and timber ringwork fortress in Haltwhistle, Northumberland, England. There are no extant stone remains.

References

Castles in Northumberland
Norman architecture in England
Haltwhistle